Herman Kluge (January 12, 1905 – June 22, 1991) was an American football and swimming coach. He was born in Milwaukee, graduated from Riverside High School, and graduated from Milwaukee State Teachers College (later renamed University of Wisconsin–Milwaukee) in 1927, where he competed for the football and track teams. He received a master's degree in physical education from New York University. He served as the head football and swimming coach at his alma mater from 1931 to 1969. He led the football team to six conference championships (1931, 1938, 1939, 1942, 1947 and 1948). He was also the school's athletic director from 1937 to 1970 and chairman of the physical education department. He continued teaching at the school until 1974. He was inducted into the University of Wisconsin-Milwaukee Hall of Fame as part of its inaugural class in 1972.

Head coaching record

Football

References

External links
 

1905 births
1991 deaths
Milwaukee Panthers athletic directors
Milwaukee Panthers football coaches
Milwaukee Panthers football players
College men's track and field athletes in the United States
College swimming coaches in the United States
New York University alumni
Coaches of American football from Wisconsin
Players of American football from Milwaukee